The 1949 PGA Championship was the 31st PGA Championship, held May 25–31 in Virginia at Belmont Golf Course (formerly known as Hermitage Country Club), north of Richmond. Native Virginian Sam Snead won the match play championship, 3 & 2 over Johnny Palmer in the Tuesday final; the winner's share was $3,500 and the runner-up's was $1,500.

It was the second of Snead's three wins in the PGA Championship, and the fourth of his seven major titles. At age 37, Snead was the oldest to win the PGA Championship; he won again two years later in 1951.

The medalist in the stroke play qualifier was unsung Ray Wade Hill of Louisiana, who advanced to the quarterfinals.

Snead won the Masters in April; this was the first time the Masters champion had won the PGA Championship in the same calendar year. This has only been accomplished four times, most recently : Snead was followed by Jack Burke Jr. in 1956 and Jack Nicklaus in 1963 and 1975. Snead's double was in the spring, Burke and Nicklaus completed theirs in the summer.

Defending champion Ben Hogan did not play in any of the majors during the 1949 season, following a near-fatal automobile accident in west Texas in early February. In 1948, he won two majors, led the tour in money and wins (ten), and was player of the year; he had won two events in January 1949 (Pebble Beach, Long Beach), with a playoff runner-up in a third (Phoenix). Although Hogan returned to the tour in 1950 on a limited basis and won six more majors (nine total), he did not enter the PGA Championship again until age 48 in 1960, its third year as a stroke play event.

Format
The match play format at the PGA Championship in 1949 called for 12 rounds (216 holes) in seven days:
 Wednesday and Thursday – 36-hole stroke play qualifier, 18 holes per day;
the top 64 professionals advanced to match play
 defending champion Ben Hogan did not enter, out for the season with injuries from an automobile accident
 Friday – first two rounds, 18 holes each
 Saturday – third round – 36 holes
 Sunday – quarterfinals – 36 holes
 Monday – semifinals – 36 holes
 Tuesday – final – 36 holes

Past champions in the field

Failed to qualify

Source:

Final results
Tuesday, May 31, 1949

Final eight bracket

Final match scorecards
Morning

^ = picked up ball (hole concession)

Afternoon

Source:

References

External links
PGA Media Guide 2012
GolfCompendium.com – 1949 PGA Championship
PGA of America – 1949 PGA Championship

PGA Championship
Golf in Virginia
Sports in Richmond, Virginia
PGA Championship
PGA Championship
PGA Championship
PGA Championship